Ectomomyrmex astutus is a species of ant in the genus Ectomomyrmex. Described by Smith in 1858, the species is endemic to Asia and Australia.

References

Ponerinae
Hymenoptera of Asia
Hymenoptera of Australia
Insects described in 1858